The 29th Los Angeles Film Critics Association Awards, given by the Los Angeles Film Critics Association (LAFCA) on January 7, 2004, honored the best in film for 2003. The ceremony was originally called off because of the MPAA screener ban as members felt they could not see all the movies in time for their awards but when that was removed the show was back on.

Winners

Best Picture:
American Splendor
Runner-up: Lost in Translation
Best Director:
Peter Jackson – The Lord of the Rings: The Return of the King
Runner-up: Clint Eastwood – Mystic River
Best Actor:
Bill Murray – Lost in Translation
Runner-up: Sean Penn – 21 Grams and Mystic River
Best Actress:
Naomi Watts – 21 Grams
Runner-up: Charlize Theron – Monster
Best Supporting Actor:
Bill Nighy – AKA, I Capture the Castle, Lawless Heart, and Love Actually
Runner-up: Benicio del Toro – 21 Grams
Best Supporting Actress:
Shohreh Aghdashloo – House of Sand and Fog
Runner-up: Melissa Leo – 21 Grams
Best Screenplay:
Shari Springer Berman and Robert Pulcini – American Splendor
Runner-up: Steven Knight – Dirty Pretty Things
Best Cinematography:
Eduardo Serra – Girl with a Pearl Earring
Runner-up: Harris Savides – Elephant
Best Production Design:
Grant Major – The Lord of the Rings: The Return of the King
Runner-up: William Sandell – Master and Commander: The Far Side of the World
Best Music Score:
Benoît Charest and Matthieu Chedid – The Triplets of Belleville (Les triplettes de Belleville)
Runner-up: Christopher Guest, John Michael Higgins, Eugene Levy, Michael McKean, Catherine O'Hara, Annette O'Toole, Harry Shearer, and C. J. Vanston – A Mighty Wind
Best Foreign-Language Film:
The Man on the Train (L'homme du train) • France
Runner-up: City of God (Cidade de Deus) • Brazil/France
Best Documentary/Non-Fiction Film:
The Fog of War
Runner-up: Capturing the Friedmans
Best Animation:
The Triplets of Belleville (Les triplettes de Belleville)
The Douglas Edwards Experimental/Independent Film/Video Award:
Thom Andersen – Los Angeles Plays Itself
Pat O'Neill – The Decay of Fiction
New Generation Award:
Scarlett Johansson
Career Achievement Award:
Robert Altman
Special Citation:
Disney restoration of the Walt Disney/Salvador Dalí short Destino

References

External links
 29th Annual Los Angeles Film Critics Association Awards

2003
Los Angeles Film Critics Association Awards
Los Angeles Film Critics Association Awards
Los Angeles Film Critics Association Awards
Los Angeles Film Critics Association Awards